Raymond Hitchcock (October 22, 1865November 24, 1929) was an American silent film actor, stage actor, and stage producer, who appeared in, or produced 30 plays on Broadway from 1898 to 1928, and who appeared in the silent films of the 1920s.

Biography

He appeared first as a star in the character of Abijah Booze in The Yankee Consul, and sang It Was Not Like This in the Olden Time. In his stage career, Hitchcock went back and forth between dramatic roles and ones in comic opera. In 1905 he appeared on Broadway with John Bunny in Easy Dawson, the two apparently playing firemen. Hitchcock also made several phonograph recordings, many of which survive.

In 1907, Hitchcock was charged with the sexual abuse of two adolescent girls together with New York magnate William A. Chanler. 
As Hitchcock's trial progressed, it was revealed that the charges of sexual abuse were fabricated as part of a blackmail scheme. Hitchcock was acquitted by a jury on June 11, 1908, after spending almost nine months in prison.

In 1925, Hitchcock appeared in a test film made by Lee DeForest in DeForest's Phonofilm sound-on-film process, in which Hitchcock performed a sketch from his Hitchy-Koo revues, which he produced on Broadway in 1917, 1918, 1919, and 1920. Cole Porter wrote the music for the 1919 version. Hitchcock also figured prominently in John Ford's Upstream (1927).

He died suddenly on November 24, 1929 at his home in Beverly Hills, California.

Personal life
Hitchcock was married to Freda Bowen from 1891 to 1903, and then was married to actress Flora Zabelle (1880-1968) from 1905 to his death in 1929. Hitchcock and Zabelle had no children. In one of her few movie roles, Zabelle appeared in the silent film The Red Widow (1916) opposite male lead John Barrymore. Barrymore's role had been played by Hitchcock in the 1911 Broadway production of The Red Widow.

Partial filmography
 The Ringtailed Rhinoceros (1915)
 My Valet (1915)
 A Village Scandal (1915)
 The Red Widow (1916)
 Redheads Preferred (1926)
 Upstream (1927)
 The Monkey Talks (1927)
 The Tired Business Man (1927)

References

External links

Raymond Hitchcock at Allmovie
Raymond Hitchcock at Silent Era
Audio works 1910-1916 by Raymond Hitchcock at Internet Archive
Marriage of Raymond Hitchcock to Flora Zabelle 1905

1865 births
1929 deaths
Male actors from New York (state)
American male stage actors
American male silent film actors
People from Auburn, New York
American theatre managers and producers
20th-century American male actors